The Other Sister is a 1999 American romantic comedy film directed by Garry Marshall and stars Juliette Lewis, Giovanni Ribisi, Diane Keaton and Tom Skerritt. It was filmed in Long Beach, Pasadena, and San Francisco, California. The film was written by Marshall, Bob Brunner and Malia Scotch Marmo (uncredited).

Plot
After receiving a well-earned certification from a sheltered boarding school, Carla Tate, an ambitious and mildly mentally disabled young woman, returns home to her overprotective and slightly snobby mother Elizabeth. Elizabeth seems to behave as if she is embarrassed about her youngest daughter's disability. During family discussions, Elizabeth adopts an uneasy attitude because her daughter was humiliated by those mean people as a child. Carla's father Radley is a dentist and recovering alcoholic. Carla's ambition is to seek more independence from her family by earning a diploma from a polytechnic school. When Carla meets another mentally disabled student, Daniel McMahon (nicknamed "Danny"), they become friends and soon fall in love together. Envying Danny's freedom, Carla convinces her parents she is capable of living on her own and moves into her own apartment. After a time, Carla and Danny become sexually active together.

Danny's independence is financially compromised when his wealthy and emotionally detached father abruptly stops sending subsistence money. Danny begins to realize that the independence he enjoyed comes with a staggering cost. Danny gets drunk, then seeks solace and insight (and a joyride in a vintage Ford Mustang convertible) from his landlord and friend, Ernie.

During a Christmas party at the country club, nervous about his personal lot, Danny drinks too much to build up his courage to declare his love for Carla. He also tells everyone about their first time making love. A humiliated Carla bursts into tears, screaming at everyone to stop laughing at her. Although Daniel did not intend to embarrass Carla, she nonetheless refuses to see him. Over time, Carla realizes she still loves Danny and wants to see him again despite her mother's advising her otherwise. At her older sister Caroline's wedding, Danny surprises Carla by showing up at the church and asks her to marry him, in a scene mimicking The Graduate, the couple's favorite film, to which she accepts.
 
Everyone supports their wishes except Elizabeth, who is unsure Danny can take care of himself, let alone Carla. Carla angrily tells her mother that she is sick of her combination of three behaviors: dominance, negativity, and doubt. Also, Carla is sick of her mother constantly treating her like two things at once: an embarrassment and a handicap. Radley and her sisters, Heather and Caroline, support her decision, and the wedding is planned. At first, Elizabeth is determined not to attend, but Radley admonishes her. He said that he will walk Carla down the aisle. Finally, after realizing how selfish she has been behaving, Elizabeth relents. Outside the church, Danny surprises Carla with their school's marching band playing "76 Trombones" from The Music Man, and they are chauffeured away to their honeymoon in Ernie's prized Mustang.

Cast

 Juliette Lewis as Carla Tate
 Kendra Krull as Young Carla
 Diane Keaton as Elizabeth Tate
 Tom Skerritt as Dr. Radley Tate
 Giovanni Ribisi as Daniel "Danny" McMahon
 Poppy Montgomery as Caroline Tate
 Brooke Garrett as Young Caroline
 Sarah Paulson as Heather Tate
 Brighton McCloskey as Young Heather
 Linda Thorson as Drew Evanson
 Joe Flanigan as Jeff Reed
 Juliet Mills as Winnie the Housekeeper
 Tracy Reiner as Michelle
 Hector Elizondo as Ernie

Soundtrack

The Other Sister: Music from the Motion Picture was released on February 23, 1999. The lead song for the soundtrack was "The Animal Song" by Savage Garden. The music video for the song featured scenes from the film. It peaked at #109 on the Billboard 200 albums chart.

Track listing

All track information and credits were taken from the CD liner notes.

Release

Box office
The Other Sister opened at #3 at the North American box office making $6.6 million in its opening weekend behind Payback and 8mm, which opened at the top spot. It ultimately grossed $27.8 million in the United States and Canada, failing to recoup its $35 million budget, becoming a box office bomb.

Critical reception
The film received negative reviews from critics. On Rotten Tomatoes, the film maintains a 29% rating, based on 48 reviews, with an average rating of 4.7/10. The site's consensus: "Made-for-tv drama evokes anything but real emotion." Metacritic reports a 28 out of 100 rating, based on 21 critics, indicating "generally unfavorable reviews".

Roger Ebert rated the film at one out of four possible stars, and said the film was "shameless in its use of mental retardation as a gimmick, a prop and a plot device."

Accolades
Lewis was nominated for a Golden Raspberry Award for Worst Supporting Actress for her performance, where she lost to Denise Richards for The World Is Not Enough.

References

External links

 
 
 
 
 

1990s English-language films
1990s American films
1999 films
1999 comedy-drama films
1999 romantic comedy-drama films
American romantic comedy-drama films
Films_about_autism
Films about intellectual disability
Films about weddings
Films directed by Garry Marshall
Films scored by Rachel Portman
Films set in San Francisco
Films set in the San Francisco Bay Area
Films shot in California
Films shot in San Francisco
Mandeville Films films
Touchstone Pictures films
Films about sisters
Films about mother–daughter relationships
Films about disability